Paul Massey may refer to:
Paul Massey (rower) (1926–2009), British rower and Olympian
Paul Massey (gangster) (1960–2015), English criminal and Salford-based businessman
Paul Massey (sound engineer) (born 1958), English sound engineer

See also
Paul Massie (1932–2011), Canadian actor and academic